Maria language may refer to:
Maria language (India)
Maria language (Papua New Guinea)